This is a list of theatres in Melbourne in Victoria, Australia.

Melbourne City Centre
The Melbourne City Centre has two distinct areas with concentrations of theatres: the East End, situated in the Hoddle Grid, which contains many of Melbourne's historic theatres; and Southbank, which is home to the more contemporary venues of the Melbourne Arts Precinct.

East End, Hoddle Grid

Arts Precinct, Southbank

Independent/fringe
Notable venues for independent or fringe theatre in the Melbourne City Centre.

Inner-Melbourne

Suburban

See also

List of theatres in Sydney
List of theatres in Hobart

References

Lists of buildings and structures in Melbourne
Melbourne
 
Tourist attractions in Melbourne
Melbourne